Demography is the statistical study of populations, especially human beings.

Demographic analysis examines and measures the dimensions and dynamics of populations; it can cover whole societies or groups defined by criteria such as education, nationality, religion, and ethnicity. Educational institutions usually treat demography as a field of sociology, though there are a number of independent demography departments. These methods have primarily been developed to study human populations, but are extended to a variety of areas where researchers want to know how populations of social actors can change across time through processes of birth, death, and migration.   In the context of human biological populations, demographic analysis uses administrative records to develop an independent estimate of the population. Demographic analysis estimates are often considered a reliable standard for judging the accuracy of the census information gathered at any time.  In the labor force, demographic analysis is used to estimate sizes and flows of populations of workers; in population ecology the focus is on the birth, death, migration and immigration of individuals in a population of living organisms, alternatively, in social human sciences could involve movement of firms and institutional forms. Demographic analysis is used in a wide variety of contexts. For example, it is often used in business plans, to describe the population connected to the geographic location of the business. Demographic analysis is usually abbreviated as DA. For the 2010 U.S. Census, The U.S. Census Bureau has expanded its DA categories. Also as part of the 2010 U.S. Census, DA now also includes comparative analysis between independent housing estimates, and census address lists at different key time points.

Patient demographics form the core of the data for any medical institution, such as patient and emergency contact information and patient medical record data. They allow for the identification of a patient and his categorization into categories for the purpose of statistical analysis. Patient demographics include: date of birth, gender, date of death, postal code, ethnicity, blood type, emergency contact information, family doctor, insurance provider data, allergies, major diagnoses and major medical history.

Formal demography limits its object of study to the measurement of population processes, while the broader field of social demography or population studies also analyses the relationships between economic, social, institutional, cultural, and biological processes influencing a population.

History
Demographic thoughts traced back to antiquity, and were present in many civilisations and cultures, like Ancient Greece, Ancient Rome, China and India. Made up of the prefix demo- and the suffix -graphy, the term demography refers to the overall study of population.

In ancient Greece, this can be found in the writings of Herodotus, Thucydides, Hippocrates, Epicurus, Protagoras, Polus, Plato and Aristotle. In Rome, writers and philosophers like Cicero, Seneca, Pliny the Elder, Marcus Aurelius, Epictetus, Cato, and Columella also expressed important ideas on this ground.

In the Middle Ages, Christian thinkers devoted much time in refuting the Classical ideas on demography.  Important contributors to the field were William of Conches, Bartholomew of Lucca, William of Auvergne, William of Pagula, and Muslim sociologists like Ibn Khaldun.

One of the earliest demographic studies in the modern period was Natural and Political Observations Made upon the Bills of Mortality (1662) by John Graunt, which contains a primitive form of life table. Among the study's findings were that one-third of the children in London died before their sixteenth birthday. Mathematicians, such as Edmond Halley, developed the life table as the basis for life insurance mathematics. Richard Price was credited with the first textbook on life contingencies published in 1771, followed later by Augustus De Morgan, On the Application of Probabilities to Life Contingencies (1838).

In 1755, Benjamin Franklin published his essay Observations Concerning the Increase of Mankind, Peopling of Countries, etc., projecting exponential growth in British colonies. His work influenced Thomas Robert Malthus, who, writing at the end of the 18th century, feared that, if unchecked, population growth would tend to outstrip growth in food production, leading to ever-increasing famine and poverty (see Malthusian catastrophe). Malthus is seen as the intellectual father of ideas of overpopulation and the limits to growth. Later, more sophisticated and realistic models were presented by Benjamin Gompertz and Verhulst.

In 1855, a Belgian scholar Achille Guillard defined demography as the natural and social history of human species or the mathematical knowledge of populations, of their general changes, and of their physical, civil, intellectual, and moral condition.

The period 1860–1910 can be characterized as a period of transition where in demography emerged from statistics as a separate field of interest. This period included a panoply of international ‘great demographers’ like Adolphe Quetelet (1796–1874), William Farr (1807–1883), Louis-Adolphe Bertillon (1821–1883) and his son Jacques (1851–1922), Joseph Körösi (1844–1906), Anders Nicolas Kaier (1838–1919), Richard Böckh (1824–1907), Émile Durkheim (1858–1917), Wilhelm Lexis (1837–1914), and Luigi Bodio (1840–1920) contributed to the development of demography and to the toolkit of methods and techniques of demographic analysis.

Methods
Demography is the statistical and mathematical study of the size, composition, and spatial distribution of human populations and how these features change over time.  Data are obtained from a census of the population and from registries: records of events like birth, deaths, migrations, marriages, divorces, diseases, and employment.  To do this, there needs to be an understanding of how they are calculated and the questions they answer which are included in these four concepts: population change, standardization of population numbers, the demographic bookkeeping equation, and population composition.

There are two types of data collection—direct and indirect—with several methods of each type.

Direct methods 
Direct data comes from vital statistics registries that track all births and deaths as well as certain changes in legal status such as marriage, divorce, and migration (registration of place of residence). In developed countries with good registration systems (such as the United States and much of Europe), registry statistics are the best method for estimating the number of births and deaths.

A census is the other common direct method of collecting demographic data. A census is usually conducted by a national government and attempts to enumerate every person in a country. In contrast to vital statistics data, which are typically collected continuously and summarized on an annual basis, censuses typically occur only every 10 years or so, and thus are not usually the best source of data on births and deaths. Analyses are conducted after a census to estimate how much over or undercounting took place. These compare the sex ratios from the census data to those estimated from natural values and mortality data.

Censuses do more than just count people. They typically collect information about families or households in addition to individual characteristics such as age, sex, marital status, literacy/education, employment status, and occupation, and geographical location. They may also collect data on migration (or place of birth or of previous residence), language, religion, nationality (or ethnicity or race), and citizenship.  In countries in which the vital registration system may be incomplete, the censuses are also used as a direct source of information about fertility and mortality; for example, the censuses of the People's Republic of China gather information on births and deaths that occurred in the 18 months immediately preceding the census.

Indirect methods 
Indirect methods of collecting data are required in countries and periods where full data are not available, such as is the case in much of the developing world, and most of historical demography. One of these techniques in contemporary demography is the sister method, where survey researchers ask women how many of their sisters have died or had children and at what age. With these surveys, researchers can then indirectly estimate birth or death rates for the entire population. Other indirect methods in contemporary demography include asking people about siblings, parents, and children. Other indirect methods are necessary in historical demography.

There are a variety of demographic methods for modelling population processes. They include models of mortality (including the life table, Gompertz models, hazards models, Cox proportional hazards models, multiple decrement life tables, Brass relational logits), fertility (Hermes model, Coale-Trussell models, parity progression ratios), marriage (Singulate Mean at Marriage, Page model), disability (Sullivan's method, multistate life tables), population projections (Lee-Carter model, the Leslie Matrix), and population momentum (Keyfitz).

The United Kingdom has a series of four national birth cohort studies, the first three spaced apart by 12 years: the 1946 National Survey of Health and Development, the 1958 National Child Development Study, the 1970 British Cohort Study, and the Millennium Cohort Study, begun much more recently in 2000. These have followed the lives of samples of people (typically beginning with around 17,000 in each study) for many years, and are still continuing. As the samples have been drawn in a nationally representative way, inferences can be drawn from these studies about the differences between four distinct generations of British people in terms of their health, education, attitudes, childbearing and employment patterns.

Indirect standardization is used when a population is small enough that the number of events (births, deaths, etc.) are also small. In this case, methods must be used to produce a standardized mortality rate (SMR) or standardized incidence rate (SIR).

Population change
Population change is analyzed by measuring the change between one population size to another. Global population continues to rise, which makes population change an essential component to demographics. This is calculated by taking one population size minus the population size in an earlier census.  The best way of measuring population change is using the intercensal percentage change.  The intercensal percentage change is the absolute change in population between the censuses divided by the population size in the earlier census. Next, multiply this a hundredfold to receive a percentage.  When this statistic is achieved, the population growth between two or more nations that differ in size, can be accurately measured and examined.

Standardization of population numbers
For there to be a significant comparison, numbers must be altered for the size of the population that is under study. For example, the fertility rate is calculated as the ratio of the number of births to women of childbearing age to the total number of women in this age range. If these adjustments were not made, we would not know if a nation with a higher rate of births or deaths has a population with more women of childbearing age or more births per eligible woman.

Within the category of standardization, there are two major approaches: direct standardization and indirect standardization.

Common rates and ratios
 The crude birth rate, the annual number of live births per 1,000 people.
 The general fertility rate, the annual number of live births per 1,000 women of childbearing age (often taken to be from 15 to 49 years old, but sometimes from 15 to 44).
 The age-specific fertility rates, the annual number of live births per 1,000 women in particular age groups (usually age 15–19, 20–24 etc.)
 The crude death rate, the annual number of deaths per 1,000 people.
 The infant mortality rate, the annual number of deaths of children less than 1 year old per 1,000 live births.
 The expectation of life (or life expectancy), the number of years that an individual at a given age could expect to live at present mortality levels.
 The total fertility rate, the number of live births per woman completing her reproductive life, if her childbearing at each age reflected current age-specific fertility rates.
 The replacement level fertility, the average number of children women must have in order to replace the population for the next generation. For example, the replacement level fertility in the US is 2.11.
 The gross reproduction rate, the number of daughters who would be born to a woman completing her reproductive life at current age-specific fertility rates.
 The net reproduction ratio is the expected number of daughters, per newborn prospective mother, who may or may not survive to and through the ages of childbearing.
 A stable population, one that has had constant crude birth and death rates for such a long period of time that the percentage of people in every age class remains constant, or equivalently, the population pyramid has an unchanging structure.
 A stationary population, one that is both stable and unchanging in size (the difference between crude birth rate and crude death rate is zero).

A stable population does not necessarily remain fixed in size. It can be expanding or shrinking.

Note that the crude death rate as defined above and applied to a whole population can give a misleading impression. For example, the number of deaths per 1,000 people can be higher in developed nations than in less-developed countries, despite standards of health being better in developed countries. This is because developed countries have proportionally more older people, who are more likely to die in a given year, so that the overall mortality rate can be higher even if the mortality rate at any given age is lower. A more complete picture of mortality is given by a life table, which summarizes mortality separately at each age. A life table is necessary to give a good estimate of life expectancy.

Basic equation regarding development of a population
Suppose that a country (or other entity) contains Populationt persons at time t.
What is the size of the population at time t + 1 ?

Natural increase from time t to t + 1:

Net migration from time t to t + 1:

These basic equations can also be applied to subpopulations.  For example, the population size of ethnic groups or nationalities within a given society or country is subject to the same sources of change.  When dealing with ethnic groups, however, "net migration" might have to be subdivided into physical migration and ethnic reidentification (assimilation).  Individuals who change their ethnic self-labels or whose ethnic classification in government statistics changes over time may be thought of as migrating or moving from one population subcategory to another.

More generally, while the basic demographic equation holds true by definition, in practice the recording and counting of events (births, deaths, immigration, emigration) and the enumeration of the total population size are subject to error. So allowance needs to be made for error in the underlying statistics when any accounting of population size or change is made.

The figure in this section shows the latest (2004) UN (United Nations) WHO projections of world population out to the year 2150 (red = high, orange = medium, green = low). The UN "medium" projection shows world population reaching an approximate equilibrium at 9 billion by 2075. Working independently, demographers at the International Institute for Applied Systems Analysis in Austria expect world population to peak at 9 billion by 2070. Throughout the 21st century, the average age of the population is likely to continue to rise.

Science of population
Populations can change through three processes: fertility, mortality, and migration.  Fertility involves the number of children that women have and is to be contrasted with fecundity (a woman's childbearing potential). Mortality is the study of the causes, consequences, and measurement of processes affecting death to members of the population.  Demographers most commonly study mortality using the life table, a statistical device that provides information about the mortality conditions (most notably the life expectancy) in the population.

Migration refers to the movement of persons from a locality of origin to a destination place across some predefined, political boundary. Migration researchers do not designate movements 'migrations' unless they are somewhat permanent.  Thus, demographers do not consider tourists and travellers to be migrating. While demographers who study migration typically do so through census data on place of residence, indirect sources of data including tax forms and labour force surveys are also important.

Demography is today widely taught in many universities across the world, attracting students with initial training in social sciences, statistics or health studies. Being at the crossroads of several disciplines such as sociology, economics, epidemiology, geography, anthropology and history, demography offers tools to approach a large range of population issues by combining a more technical quantitative approach that represents the core of the discipline with many other methods borrowed from social or other sciences. Demographic research is conducted in universities, in research institutes, as well as in statistical departments and in several international agencies. Population institutions are part of the CICRED (International Committee for Coordination of Demographic Research) network while most individual scientists engaged in demographic research are members of the International Union for the Scientific Study of Population, or a national association such as the Population Association of America in the United States, or affiliates of the Federation of Canadian Demographers in Canada.

Population composition
Population composition is the description of population defined by characteristics such as age, race, sex or marital status.  These descriptions can be necessary for understanding the social dynamics from historical and comparative research.  This data is often compared using a population pyramid.

Population composition is also a very important part of historical research.  Information ranging back hundreds of years is not always worthwhile, because the numbers of people for which data are available may not provide the information that is important (such as population size).  Lack of information on the original data-collection procedures may prevent accurate evaluation of data quality.

Demographic analysis in institutions and organizations

Labor market
The demographic analysis of labor markets can be used to show slow population growth, population aging, and the increased importance of immigration.  The U.S. Census Bureau projects that in the next 100 years, the United States will face some dramatic demographic changes.  The population is expected to grow more slowly and age more rapidly than ever before and the nation will become a nation of immigrants.  This influx is projected to rise over the next century as new immigrants and their children will account for over half the U.S. population.  These demographic shifts could ignite major adjustments in the economy, more specifically, in labor markets.

Turnover and in internal labor markets
People decide to exit organizations for many reasons, such as, better jobs, dissatisfaction, and concerns within the family.  The causes of turnover can be split into two separate factors, one linked with the culture of the organization, and the other relating to all other factors.  People who do not fully accept a culture might leave voluntarily.  Or, some individuals might leave because they fail to fit in and fail to change within a particular organization.

Population ecology of organizations

A basic definition of population ecology is a study of the distribution and abundance of organisms.  As it relates to organizations and demography, organizations go through various liabilities to their continued survival.  Hospitals, like all other large and complex organizations are impacted in the environment they work. For example, a study was done on the closure of acute care hospitals in Florida between a particular time.  The study examined effect size, age, and niche density of these particular hospitals. A population theory says that organizational outcomes are mostly determined by environmental factors.  Among several factors of the theory, there are four that apply to the hospital closure example: size, age, density of niches in which organizations operate, and density of niches in which organizations are established.

Business organizations
Problems in which demographers may be called upon to assist business organizations are when determining the best prospective location in an area of a branch store or service outlet, predicting the demand for a new product, and to analyze certain dynamics of a company's workforce.  Choosing a new location for a branch of a bank, choosing the area in which to start a new supermarket, consulting a bank loan officer that a particular location would be a beneficial site to start a car wash, and determining what shopping area would be best to buy and be redeveloped in metropolis area are types of problems in which demographers can be called upon.

Standardization is a useful demographic technique used in the analysis of a business.  It can be used as an interpretive and analytic tool for the comparison of different markets.

Nonprofit organizations
These organizations have interests about the number and characteristics of their clients so they can maximize the sale of their products, their outlook on their influence, or the ends of their power, services, and beneficial works.

See also

 Biodemography
 Biodemography of human longevity
 Demographics of the world
 Demographic economics
 Gompertz–Makeham law of mortality
 Linguistic demography
 List of demographics articles
 Medieval demography
 National Security Study Memorandum 200 of 1974
 NRS social grade
 Political demography
 Population biology
 Population dynamics
 Population geography
 Population reconstruction
 Population statistics
 Religious demography
 Replacement migration
 Reproductive health

Social surveys
 Current Population Survey (CPS)
 Demographic and Health Surveys (DHS)
 European Social Survey (ESS)
 General Social Survey (GSS)
 German General Social Survey (ALLBUS)
 Multiple Indicator Cluster Surveys (MICS)
 National Longitudinal Survey (NLS)
 Panel Study of Income Dynamics (PSID)
 Performance Monitoring and Accountability 2020 (PMA2020)
 Socio-Economic Panel (SOEP, German)
 World Values Survey (WVS)

Organizations
 Global Social Change Research Project (United States)
 Institut national d'études démographiques (INED) (France)
 Max Planck Institute for Demographic Research (Germany)
 Office of Population Research (Princeton University) (United States)
 Population Council (United States)
 Population Studies Center at the University of Michigan (United States)
 Vienna Institute of Demography (VID) (Austria)
 Wittgenstein Centre for Demography and Global Human Capital (Austria)

Scientific journals
 Brazilian Journal of Population Studies
 Cahiers québécois de démographie
 Demography
 Population and Development Review

References

Further reading
 Josef Ehmer, Jens Ehrhardt, Martin Kohli (Eds.): Fertility in the History of the 20th Century: Trends, Theories, Policies, Discourses.  Historical Social Research 36 (2), 2011.
 Glad, John. 2008. Future Human Evolution: Eugenics in the Twenty-First Century. Hermitage Publishers, 
 Gavrilova N.S., Gavrilov L.A. 2011. Ageing and Longevity: Mortality Laws and Mortality Forecasts for Ageing Populations [In Czech: Stárnutí a dlouhověkost: Zákony a prognózy úmrtnosti pro stárnoucí populace]. Demografie,  53(2): 109–128.
 Preston, Samuel, Patrick Heuveline, and Michel Guillot. 2000. Demography: Measuring and Modeling Population Processes. Blackwell Publishing.
 Gavrilov L.A., Gavrilova N.S.  2010. Demographic Consequences of Defeating Aging.  Rejuvenation Research, 13(2-3): 329–334.
 Paul R. Ehrlich (1968), The Population Bomb Controversial Neo-Malthusianist pamphlet
 Leonid A. Gavrilov & Natalia S. Gavrilova (1991), The Biology of Life Span: A Quantitative Approach. New York: Harwood Academic Publisher, 
 Andrey Korotayev & Daria Khaltourina (2006). Introduction to Social Macrodynamics: Compact Macromodels of the World System Growth. Moscow: URSS   
 Uhlenberg P. (Editor), (2009) International Handbook of the Demography of Aging, New York:  Springer-Verlag, pp. 113–131.
 Paul Demeny and Geoffrey McNicoll (Eds.). 2003. The Encyclopedia of Population. New York, Macmillan Reference USA, vol.1, 32-37
 Phillip Longman (2004), The Empty Cradle: how falling birth rates threaten global prosperity and what to do about it
 Sven Kunisch, Stephan A. Boehm, Michael Boppel (eds) (2011). From Grey to Silver: Managing the Demographic Change Successfully, Springer-Verlag, Berlin Heidelberg, 
 Joe McFalls  (2007), Population: A Lively Introduction, Population Reference Bureau 
 Ben J. Wattenberg (2004), How the New Demography of Depopulation Will Shape Our Future. Chicago: R. Dee, 
 Perry, Marc J. & Mackun, Paul J. Population Change & Distribution: Census 2000 Brief. (2001)
Preston, Samuel; Heuveline,Patrick; and Guillot Michel. 2000. Demography: Measuring and Modeling Population Processes. Blackwell Publishing.
 Schutt, Russell K. 2006. "Investigating the Social World: The Process and Practice of Research". SAGE Publications.
 Siegal, Jacob S. (2002), Applied Demography: Applications to Business, Government, Law, and Public Policy. San Diego: Academic Press.
 Wattenberg, Ben J. (2004), How the New Demography of Depopulation Will Shape Our Future. Chicago: R. Dee,

External links 

 Quick demography data lookup (archived 4 March 2016)
 
 Historicalstatistics.org Links to historical demographic and economic statistics
 United Nations Population Division: Homepage
 World Population Prospects, the 2012 Revision, Population estimates and projections for 230 countries and areas (archived 6 May 2011)
 World Urbanization Prospects, the 2011 Revision, Estimates and projections of urban and rural populations and urban agglomerations
 Probabilistic Population Projections, the 2nd Revision, Probabilistic Population Projections, based on the 2010 Revision of the World Population Prospects (archived 13 December 2012)
 Java Simulation of Population Dynamics.
 Basic Guide to the World: Population changes and trends, 1960–2003
 Brief review of world basic demographic trends
 Family and Fertility Surveys (FFS)

 
Actuarial science
Environmental social science
Interdisciplinary subfields of sociology
Human geography
Market segmentation
Human populations